Peace Memorial Rose Garden is a rose garden in Nedlands, Western Australia, dedicated to the memory of lives lost in war.

It is located on Stirling Highway and bounded by Louise and Vincent Streets.

It was developed by the Nedlands Road Board and the National Rose Society of Western Australia.

It was proposed in the 1940s. 

Consideration of a site in Kings Park was made in the 1940s. 

Land in Nedlands was made available in the late 1940s.

Further plans were made in 1950. 

The garden was dedicated by the Governor of Western Australia, James Mitchell on 22 October 1950.

References

Nedlands, Western Australia
Gardens in Perth, Western Australia
Stirling Highway
Rose gardens in Australia
Peace monuments and memorials